The Bahamas cricket team toured the Cayman Islands in April 2022 to play a five-match Twenty20 International (T20I) matches against the Cayman Islands. The series was played in George Town, with the first two matches at the Jimmy Powell Oval and the remaining three matches at the Smith Road Oval. The Cayman Islands won all of the matches to take the series 5–0.

Squads

T20I series

1st T20I

2nd T20I

3rd T20I

4th T20I

5th T20I

References

External links
 Series home at ESPN Cricinfo

Associate international cricket competitions in 2021–22